is a Japanese manga series written and illustrated by Yokusaru Shibata. It was serialized in Hakusensha's seinen manga magazine Young Animal from 1996 to 2006, with its chapters collected in twenty-eight tankōbon volumes. The story focuses on Maki Aikawa, an ex-gymnast turned street fighter.

A twenty-seven episode anime television series adaptation animated by Toei Animation was broadcast on Nippon TV from April to October 2003. It was licensed in North America through a partnership between Toei and Geneon USA; however, only a few episodes of the series were released in the region before the cancellation of the deal, which was due to the poor quality and large number of DVD returns to Geneon.

Plot
Behind the scenes of the hustle and bustle of everyday life in Tokyo, there exist many people who strive to become stronger by competing against each other in street fights. Maki Aikawa is a 16-year-old high school student. A former gymnast, Maki adapts her skills to a different way of life — street fighting. The only thing that truly makes her feel alive is the rush and pressure experienced while fighting. With amazing power and grace, she fights opponent after opponent, repeatedly demonstrating the gymnastic talent that earns her the street name, "Air Master". Eventually, Maki is exposed to a fighting league of sorts, known as the "Fukamichi Rankings".

The Fukamichi Rankings consist of the world's greatest street fighters and martial artists. The Fukamichi Ranking fights are held for various reasons. Firstly, many fighters wish to test themselves, achieving the highest rank possible and stretching themselves to their physical limits. However, there is also a corporate side to the competitions, with many viewers around the world eager to watch the brutal yet awe-inspiring showdowns. Each Fukamichi ranker is paid a respective amount for winning within their fight. Maki, seeking to quench her thirst for that pressure or buzz she experiences only through fighting and to find her place within this world, scales the Fukamichi Rankings, clashing with the world's greatest fighting prodigies.

Characters

Formerly a gymnast who trained under her now-deceased mother, Maki uses her acrobatic skill in her fighting style to increase freedom of movement. Her attacks combine vertiginous leaps and somersaults with the fearsome, furious power of her kicks and throws. Maki has the ability to replicate most nearly any move she gets hit with or sees, and when in combat possesses an awe-inspiring resilience, presence, and strength of will. Since her relationship with her father is conflicted, she lives alone. Maki seems to enjoy street fighting for the 'rush' rather than any sense of revenge or honor. When not fighting, Maki tends to stick out in a crowd due to her unusual height (6 feet, which is very tall for a Japanese girl) and appearance, preferring to follow her quartet of friends quietly. Her younger sister comments that Maki is somewhat simple-minded and, despite her great strength, is reluctant to deal with several people obsessed with her. She becomes vulnerable to attack, for a moment, whenever she gets approached in any romantic way, especially with Julietta Sakamoto. Her signature moves are the "Air Spin Driver" and the "Air Cutter"; she is later shown to master the art of "Air Flow".
 

Yuu is a friend of Maki and shares some of the same interest as Renge. She is a fan of the singer Uzumi Mika. She is taking karate lessons and also has a crush on Shinnosuke, and sometimes she fights with Michiru about Shinnosuke.

Michiru is a friend of Maki. She also has a crush on Shinnosuke, but becomes upset when he admits his love for Maki. She is a fan of the model, Nono Rakuko. Yuu and Michiru make a great duo and are seldom seen apart.

One of Maki's shyer friends, who goes to a (presumably rich) private school and is most noted for having natural yet oversized breasts that she is extremely self-conscious about. In addition to this, Mina's hopelessly in love with Maki (who is very friendly to her but gets discombobulated due to her actions), even go as far as to steal a kiss from Maki, pressing her body up against hers and doing one act of nude sexsomnia to her while she is unconscious; making this the main reason why her friends shame her for having a creepy school-girl crush. However, like Maki, she has her share of fans and admirers as well; including Reiishi Mishima and many members of Kinjirou's Black Suit gang. Mina's favorite food is Belgian chocolate cake, she has been a fan of Nanjou Remon's novels since she was a child.
 

The group's extremely short friend. Renge has a penchant for eating obsessively, yet she is always thin (sometimes when she eats a lot, she is shown to have a belly). Renge is the stereotypical overexcited kid with a tendency to whine, but she serves as a cheering squad. She later acquires a kitten that she carries with her most of the time. She also has "psychic" powers. Her character was not well-received by fans because of her annoying voice.

Maki's estranged father who was only 15 years old when she was born, which would make him around 31 when he is first introduced, Shiro is a four-time pro-fighting champion. He runs a dojo and raises Maki's half-sister, Miori. He is later beaten by Sakamoto, but they manage to become friends later on.
 

Maki's younger, somewhat bratty half-sister. Due to having the same martial artist father, Miori also shares some of her older sister's fighting ability, although she lacks her gravity-defying gymnastic skills, which Maki evidently inherited from her mother. In her first appearance, she suddenly attacks Maki. She is about the same height as Renge, though she is younger. She later decides to move in with Maki and grows to idolize Sanpagita Kai.

A wannabe model with an obsessive, one-sided rivalry with Maki. Kaori later becomes a moderately good fighter, and accomplishes things by sheer force of will and determination. She is loud and over-dramatic, but during extended fights will devolves into a berserker who'll keep on fighting unless violently knocked out. A running gag in the show is how most characters refer to her by her full name in a dramatic fashion, probably due to her tendency to do the same. When enraged, her appearance has been compared to Devilman. Due to a brutal assault she suffered in high school, Kaori's deaf in her right ear.

A scruffy but handsome ghost writer who becomes obsessed with Maki, while the latter is totally uninterested in him and finds his behavior very creepy. He is a smooth talker but prone to overly aggressive declarations of love (sometimes bordering on assault) towards Maki, who he calls "My Jenny" after a woman whose picture he was obsessed with as a child. He tends to always kiss her and declare his love for her when they are together, even during their fights, throwing her off-balance, albeit usually for comedic effect. He has three women who're head over heels for him: Uzumi Mika, a famous singer; Nono Rakuko, a famous model; and Nanjou Remon, a famous novelist yet he ignores them all since he is fixated on marrying Maki and making her move in with him. Maki is physically capable of beating him down in his insane-like "distracted" state of mind; however, she did have a hard time with him at first as he can take a huge amount of punishment and still keep on trucking, such as during one fight where he kept on going even after his opponent broke not only his arm but also both his legs as well. Sakamoto usually only fights with extremely fast and devastating kicks, usually leaving his hands in his pockets while fighting even though he has a powerful punch. It is said his strength is legendary on the street, which is later proven when he becomes ranked seventh in the Fukamichi Rankings after defeating Nobuhiko Fukamichi with a single kick.
 

Leader of the "League of Black-suited Gentlemen", he claims to hate women yet he likes Maki because he thinks she is different. He is a good fighter and has an incredible strong punch, having once taken down a bear with a single blow. He has a technique where he can create an afterimage of himself attacking so the opponent will be fooled into acting prematurely. He had his first kiss stolen in episode 17 by one of his male subordinates, Nagato the Long Fist, while Nagato was fighting Fukamichi. Kinjiro is ranked ninth within the Fukamichi rankings.

Though she is not initially involved in the street-fighting tournament Maki joins, Sampaguita Kai was one of her most difficult opponents. Using a similar fighting style to Maki, Kai faces her in a tag-team match during a women's wrestling tournament. She becomes obsessed, like a number of Maki's earlier opponents, with beating Maki. She is the younger sister of Lucha Master, who taught her how to fight ever since she was young. Kai gained the ninth rank within the Fukamichi Rankings after beating Shun Yashiki, however she is narrowly defeated by Kinjiro Kitaeda, which leaves her ranked tenth. Kai's signature moves are the "Izakaya Bomber" and the "Ultimate Sky Screwbomb", she learns the former from her former mentor/partner, Hayase Mio while the latter is a move of her own creation.

A guy who challenges Maki early on, but later temporarily joins the group. He seems to have a crush on Maki. He fights with a long staff that can separate into a three-section staff that he is been training with since the age of five. He later gets into a fight with Reiichi, and gets the upper hand on him, but Tsukio saves Reiichi and overwhelms Shinnosuke with his "Jack Hammer Punch". He also seems to know a bit of kung fu, but his particular style was not specified in the anime.

Lucha Master is (as the name implies) a masterful wrestler, styled after Mexican Luchadores. He always wears a mask, and he is the first major challenge Maki faces. He is one of only three characters who can use a similar sort of aerial combat to Maki. He is the older brother of Sanpaguita Kai, another character with a similar fighting style. Lucha Master is ranked twenty-first within the Fukamichi Rankings.

Another early opponent, he is a construction worker that possesses a punch similar to a jackhammer, but is not as fast as some of the other street fighters. Maki often overlooks him, especially since Lucha Master quickly showed up right after Tsukio, which infuriates him to no end. Tsukio is ranked twenty-second within the Fukamichi rankings.

A sort of hanger-on to Tsukio Taketsugu, Reiichi is sometimes a coward and a klutz. Although he can fight incredibly well if he is on a bike, using it as if it were a part of his own body, he is still only a moderately skilled street fighter. He also has a crush on Mina Nakanotani and often fantasizes about being her hero; when faced with the actual necessity of saving her from Kinjiro's mob he fights bravely, but is eventually overwhelmed and is forced to yield leadership to stronger fighters.
 

The man who runs the street fighting tournament, and who gave his name to the ranking system, Fukamichi is the one who decides who is qualified to be in the tournament rankings. He watches the fights and has videos of them streamed to his laptop, which he then broadcasts all over the world on the internet. He does not participate in the fights, but he has been shown to be extremely strong and fast. He also has a younger brother, Nobuhiko Fukamichi, who participates in the competition using weaponized fireworks. He has a hobby of critiquing restaurants and posting the results on the internet. In the final episode, Fukamichi reveals that he created the ranks to gather warriors who could defeat Eternal, the first ranked fighter.
 

Tsukio's younger cousin. Originally ranked ninth in the Fukamichi Tournament, but after losing his rank to Kai, he decided to beat the eighth ranked fighter. He is a ki manipulator and uses a technique where he uses his ki to create an osmotic punch, inducing large amount of pressure within an opponent's body and resulting in a loss of a massive amount of liquid within themselves, incapacitating them. Since he uses his life force for this technique, he can only use it a certain number of times until he needs to rest to build up his energy. He teaches this technique to Kaori Sakiyama.

Ranked number four, Yuki holds the title of "The Strongest Woman" in the Fukamichi Rankings. Her fighting style focuses on counterattacks as well as cutting and stabbing techniques with her hands. She is the second person to ever beat Maki in a fight. She starts her fight as a calm and collected individual, though Maki sees through her and knows that she likes to fight. It is implied that she was killed during her fight with Eternal, as she was knocked unconscious by him slamming her into the ground and was thus incapable of escaping the building collapsing from the sheer force of Maki and Eternal's final attacks.

The third place holder in the Fukamichi Rankings, Konishi believes he has attained perfection and specializes in grappling and submission techniques. He is shown to easily beat Shiro Saeki, who's also proficient in submission techniques, and is capable of fighting on par with and eventually defeating Sakamoto.

The first place holder in the Fukamichi Rankings, he seems to be one of many "Eternals" throughout time and is followed by an enigmatic female medium capable of contacting them. Eternal is one of, if not the strongest fighter in the world; capable of leveling an entire building in one punch. He is defeated only by the combined efforts of Maki and Yuki, both of whom he decimated in a one-on-one fight. He disappears after the building he and Maki fought in collapses, implying he was either killed by the collapse or left the building before Maki woke up.

Media

Manga
Written and illustrated by Yokusaru Shibata, Air Master was serialized in Hakusensha's seinen manga magazine Young Animal from 1996 to 2006. The chapters were collected in twenty-eight tankōbon volumes released from July 29, 1997, to May 29, 2006.

Anime
A twenty-seven episode anime television series adaptation, produced by Nippon Television, VAP and Toei Animation, was broadcast on Nippon TV from April 2 to October 1, 2003. The series was directed by Daisuke Nishio, with Michiko Yokote handling series composition, Yoshihiko Umakoshi designing the characters and Yoshihisa Hirano composing the music. VAP collected its episodes onto nine DVDs, released from July 24, 2003, and March 24, 2004; each DVD contained three episodes and a bonus yonkoma by manga author Yokusaru Shibata.

In 2004, Geneon Entertainment signed an agreement with Toei to distribute the series in North America. It was also announced that the series would air on the Canadian cable channel Razer, though it never earned a timeslot and was cancelled before broadcast. Ultimately only three DVDs of the series were released in North America, with the fourth and fifth being solicited but cancelled due to an abrupt termination of partnership between the two companies. The DVDs for the series, along with two other Toei titles, received very little advertising and suffered from poor quality, resulting in dismal sales and a large number of returns to Geneon. In 2009, Funimation gained the rights to Air Master and began streaming it on the company's official website; it was also streamed on Joost.

Episode list

Reception
Eric Friedman reviewed the anime and manga for Okazu. She called the manga "a few shounen Yuri series," calling Aikawa Maki is a "great heroine" with Maki's friend, Mina having a crush on her. She criticized the manga's art for being "distractingly ugly" even as she praised the characters as great. She described the anime as "great" despite the fact that the art is "ugly," arguing that there is a "nice handful of yuri to hold onto" in characters like Mina's love for Maki. She also praised Sakiyama Kaori as "totally psychotic, violent and strange," while also admirable and lovable, and the music score even as she noted the amount of fan service in the series.

Notes

References

External links 

 Official Air Master website (Toei Animation) 
 Official Air Master website (VAP) 
 

1996 manga
2003 anime television series debuts
Anime series based on manga
Comedy anime and manga
Funimation
Geneon USA
Hakusensha franchises
Hakusensha manga
Manga adapted into television series
Martial arts anime and manga
Nippon TV original programming
Seinen manga
Toei Animation television